Perigea is a genus of moths of the family Noctuidae. The genus was erected by Achille Guenée in 1852.

Species
The genus includes the following species:
Perigea adornata Walker, 1865
Perigea aeruginosa Schaus, 1911 Costa Rica
Perigea agalla (Dognin, 1897) Ecuador, Peru
Perigea agnonia Druce, 1890 Mexico, Guatemala, Panama
Perigea baalba Schaus, 1921 Guatemala
Perigea bahamica Hampson, 1908 Florida, the Bahamas
Perigea berinda Druce, 1889 Mexico, Guatemala, Panama, Greater Antilles, Paraguay
Perigea camerunica Gaede, 1915 Cameroon
Perigea cupricolora Hampson, 1914 Kenya
Perigea decaryi Viette, 1965 Madagascar
Perigea dinawa Bethune-Baker, 1906 Borneo, New Guinea
Perigea discincta (Butler, 1879) Brazil (Amazonas)
Perigea drusilla Schaus, 1914 French Guiana
Perigea eguigureni (Dognin, 1890) Ecuador
Perigea emilacta Berio, 1977
Perigea enixa Grote, 1875 Texas
Perigea ethiopica Hampson, 1908 Uganda
Perigea furtiva Guenée, 1852
Perigea galaxia Butler, 1883 Punjab
Perigea glaucoptera (Guenée, 1852) Brazil (Rio de Janeiro, São Paulo)
Perigea gloria Becker & Miller, 2002
Perigea grandirena (Hampson, 1902) Natal
Perigea hippia Druce, 1889 Panama, Mexico
Perigea ignitincta (Maassen, 1890) Ecuador, Peru
Perigea illicita Schaus, 1911 Costa Rica
Perigea impura Köhler, 1979 Peru
Perigea kalma (Schaus, 1894) Mexico, Guatemala, Panama
Perigea leucanioides Hampson, 1908 Mexico, Venezuela
Perigea leucopis Hampson, 1908 Brazil (Rio de Janeiro)
Perigea leucostrota Hampson, 1908 Peru
Perigea lineata (Druce, 1889) Costa Rica, Panama
Perigea menota Dyar, 1912 Mexico
Perigea metarhoda Hampson, 1908 New Guinea
Perigea micrippia Dyar, 1912 Mexico
Perigea naolina (Schaus, 1906) Brazil (Rio de Janeiro)
Perigea nigripalpis Walker, [1857] Venezuela
Perigea octophora Hampson, 1908 Peru
Perigea paragalla Dognin, 1914 Colombia
Perigea parastichtoides Hampson, 1908 Brazil (São Paulo)
Perigea pectinata (Herrich-Schäffer, 1868) Cuba, Haiti
Perigea perparvula Schaus, 1894 Brazil (Paraná), Paraguay
Perigea poliopasta Hampson, 1908 Trinidad, British Guiana, Bolivia
Perigea punctata Köhler, 1979 Peru
Perigea pyrocausta Hampson, 1911 Colombia
Perigea pyrosticta Druce, 1908 Peru
Perigea pyrostigma Hampson, 1908 Argentina
Perigea quadrimacula (Mabille, [1900]) eastern Africa, Natal
Perigea secorva Schaus, 1906 Brazil (Paraná, São Paulo), Paraguay
Perigea summota Schaus, 1911 Costa Rica
Perigea xanthioides Guenée, 1852 New York - Florida, Pennsylvania, Kansas, Texas, Jamaica, Cuba, Trinidad, Brazil (Rio de Janeiro)
Perigea xylophasioides Guenée, 1852 Brazil (Rio de Janeiro)

References

Condicinae